Superhero Music is the second album by Fingathing, released on Grand Central Records in June 2002.

Track listing
 "Intro" – 0:40
 "Ogre" – 5:07
 "Drunken Master II" – 5:33
 "Scrap" – 4:06
 "The Answer" – 0:32
 "Criminal Robots" – 4:48
 "Wasting Time" – 5:53
 "Pianogoon" – 2:40
 "Bad Gameshow Host" – 3:22
 "Bags Boogie" – 1:17
 "Haze" – 7:11
 "Skitch" – 0:51
 "Once Upon A Time In The East" – 3:26
 "Superhero Music" – 5:51
 "Spacecrumbs" – 1:53
 "The Diss" – 0:11
 "Imperial Mince" – 1:15
 "Don't Turn Around" – 5:51
 "Remember This Too" – 0:26
 "Alright Charlie!" – 2:46
 "The Chase" – 4:57
 "Epitaph" – 3:56

References

Grand Central Records albums
Fingathing albums
2002 albums